The 2005 Primera B de Chile was second tier’s 55th season. Santiago Morning was the tournament’s champion, winning its third title.

Qualification

Group stage

North Group

Centre Group

South Group

Accumulated table

Relegation table

Topscorer

References

External links
RSSSF Chile 2005

Primera B de Chile seasons
Chil
2005 in Chilean football